Susakent is a rural locality (a selo) in Ebdalayansky Selsoviet, Levashinsky District, Republic of Dagestan, Russia. The population was 475 as of 2010. There are 6 streets.

Geography 
Susakent is located 10 km southeast of Levashi (the district's administrative centre) by road. Tagirkent and Ebdalaya are the nearest rural localities.

Nationalities 
Dargins live there.

References 

Rural localities in Levashinsky District